The 2018–19 Basketball Bundesliga, known as the easyCredit BBL for sponsorship reasons, was the 53rd season of the Basketball Bundesliga (BBL), the top-tier level of professional club basketball in Germany.

Bayern Munich defended their title by defeating Alba Berlin in the finals.

Alba Berlin, runners-up of the season, qualified for the 2019–20 EuroLeague as Bayern Munich was already given a wild card.

Teams

Team changes

Arenas and locations

Personnel and sponsorship

Managerial changes

Regular season
In the regular season, teams play against each other two times home-and-away in a round-robin format. The first eight teams advance to the playoffs, while the last two placed teams will be relegated to the ProA for next season.

League table

Results

Playoffs
All three rounds of the playoffs are played in a best-of-five format, with the higher seeded team playing the first, third and fifth game at home.

Awards and statistics

Major award winners

Statistical leaders

German clubs in European competitions

See also
2018–19 BBL-Pokal

References

External links
Official website  

Basketball Bundesliga seasons
German
1